Jamie Farr (born Jameel Joseph Farah; July 1, 1934) is an American comedian and actor. He is best known for playing the cross-dressing Corporal turned Sergeant Maxwell Q. Klinger in the CBS television sitcom M*A*S*H.

He was inducted to the Hollywood Walk of Fame in 1985.

Early life
Farr was born in Toledo, Ohio, to Lebanese-American parents Jamelia M. (née Abodeely), a seamstress, and Samuel N. Farah, a grocer. He and his family attended Saint George Antiochian Orthodox Church in Toledo.

Farr's first acting success occurred at age 11, when he won two dollars in a local acting contest. After Woodward High School, where he was one of the standouts among his class, Farr attended the Pasadena Playhouse, where a Metro-Goldwyn-Mayer talent scout discovered him, offering him a screen test for Blackboard Jungle. He won the role of the mentally challenged student, Santini. With the encouragement of his Toledo mentor, Danny Thomas, he decided to become an actor. Farr is also fluent in Arabic.

Career
Farr's first film roles were in 1955 in Blackboard Jungle (credited as Jameel Farah) and as a fruit vendor in Kismet (uncredited). After this, he was drafted into the United States Army, undergoing his basic training with the 6th Infantry Division at Fort Ord, California. He served for two years, in Japan on the radio and Korea on television, making him one of three cast members of the M*A*S*H cast to have served in the U.S. military in Korea (the others being Alan Alda and Mike Farrell).

Farr said Red Skelton saved his career. Farr told the story in an interview in 2011 with the Television Academy Foundation. They had met before Farr's military service, and Farr worked with Skelton as an emcee and writer on a barnstorming USO tour entertaining U.S. troops in Korea and Japan. After his active service, while he was still on two years of active reserve, Farr was ready to give up acting when he left the Army, because his father had died, and Farr needed to find steady work to support his mother. But Skelton hired Farr on a personal contract to write for his act, gave him hundreds of dollars in cash to send to his mother, and helped him find roles. "It was Red Skelton who really saved me and kept me in the business," Farr said. For the rest of his life, he said, Farr has worn a St. Christopher's medal given to him by Skelton.

Although Farr was off to a promising start, roles were infrequent for the young actor, and he was cast as a delivery person, a post office clerk, an army store clerk, an airlines reservations agent, and as an employee at a chinchilla ranch—all small roles or bit parts. In 1958, Warner Brothers cast him as the co-pilot of a TB-25 in the Andy Griffith military comedy No Time for Sergeants, which also brought the young TV comic Don Knotts to motion pictures. Farr appeared as Thaddaeus in the 1965 film The Greatest Story Ever Told, along with minor roles in Who's Minding the Mint? and With Six You Get Eggroll.

Farr got a new acting role on television when, in the late 1950s, he became a regular on The Red Skelton Show before becoming a second banana with Harvey Korman on The Danny Kaye Show. Farr also appeared on The Dick Van Dyke Show and was a regular on the gangster-comedy series The Chicago Teddy Bears (featuring Huntz Hall). By 1965 Jamie Farr appears in My Three Sons Season 5, Episode 10, "The Coffee House" as a beatnik. In 1964, he appeared in an episode of Hazel as a soon-to-be father who owned an Italian restaurant. In 1967 he appeared in Garrison's Gorillas. Farr also worked in TV commercials, including a spot for Wonder Bread (as a vendor who says, "If it isn’t fresh, I’m outta business!").

In October 1972, he was hired for one day's work as Corporal Maxwell Klinger on the M*A*S*H episode "Chief Surgeon Who?" His character wore dresses to try to convince the army that he was "crazy" and deserved a Section 8 discharge. Comedy writer and playwright Larry Gelbart has said that comedian Lenny Bruce's attempt to be released from military service in World War II by dressing in a WAVES uniform was the original inspiration for the character of Klinger on the sitcom. He was asked back for a dozen episodes in the second season, and he became a regular in the fourth.

Eventually, his character gave up wearing women's clothing after the discharge of Radar O'Reilly had Klinger assuming the company clerk's position. Farr also ended the cross-dressing gag because, at the time, his young children were being teased about it. Like most of the characters on M*A*S*H, Klinger matured as the years passed. He gradually progressed from being a cross-dressing visual joke, and became a more sensitive and resourceful character. Klinger's colorful side emerged in new ways, as he used the Toledo wheeler-dealer skills he learned on the streets to circumvent Army bureaucracy on the 4077's behalf.

His favorite episodes are "Officer of the Day" and "Big Mac".

Farr and co-stars Harry Morgan and William Christopher spent two years starring in AfterMASH, the sequel that explored how civilian life treated their characters. While working on M*A*S*H, Farr also appeared in The Cannonball Run, Cannonball Run II, and Speed Zone, making him the only actor to have appeared in all three Cannonball Run films.

Farr was a regular judge on The Gong Show in the late 1970s. He also appeared as a panelist on several other game shows, including The $25,000 Pyramid, Super Password, Body Language, Match Game-Hollywood Squares Hour, Wordplay, The $1.98 Beauty Show, The Magnificent Marble Machine, and Tattletales.

He appeared in several made-for-TV movies such as Murder Can Hurt You, Return of the Rebels, and Combat Academy. He also guest-starred in Kolchak: The Night Stalker as a teacher, Mr. Burton, as well as a second-season episode of Emergency!.

Farr endorsed the U.S. Mars bar in commercials during the 1980s and received a star on the Hollywood Walk of Fame in 1985.

In the 1990s, Farr (and Nathan Lane) played the role of Nathan Detroit in a Broadway revival of Guys and Dolls. Farr is still active in regional theater and guest-stars occasionally on television.

Since 1984, he has hosted an annual women's professional golf tournament on the LPGA tour, the Jamie Farr Toledo Classic, presented by Kroger, Owens Corning, and O-I in Sylvania, Ohio. The tournament has raised over $6.5 million for local children's charities.

In 1996–1997 Farr went on a North American tour with The Odd Couple, playing Oscar Madison opposite his old friend William Christopher in the role of Felix Ungar. The two had appeared in several movies before they were eventually cast together in M*A*S*H.

On Memorial Day 2007, Farr hosted a multiple-episode presentation of M*A*S*H on the Hallmark Channel. The featured episodes showcased Farr's performances on the show, with Farr providing commentary during commercial intermissions.

In 2007, Farr played Adam Johnson in Hallmark original movie A Grandpa for Christmas. The TV movie starred Ernest Borgnine in the role of Bert O'Riley.

Farr, Chuck Woolery, and Bob Eubanks were rotating hosts of the $250,000 Game Show Spectacular at the Las Vegas Hilton until the show ended in April 2008.

On July 17, 2008, Farr and Anita Gillette opened Flamingo Court, a three-act play at the New World Theaters in New York City.

Farr hosts a daily radio travel feature called "Travelin' Farr".

Between late 2016 and 2018, Farr was seen promoting the M*A*S*H television series and other classic television series on the MeTV television network.

Farr had a recurring role on Fox's The Cool Kids.

Personal life
Farr's autobiography is titled Just Farr Fun.

After his role in the 1955 film Blackboard Jungle, he entered the United States Army for two years, serving overseas in Japan and Korea. His service in Korea was after the hostilities had ended.  In his M*A*S*H role as Max Klinger, he can be seen wearing his actual U.S. Army-issued dog tags.

The park in Toledo where Farr used to hang out when he was younger was renamed "Jamie Farr Park" in his honor on July 5, 1998. About the park, he said, "I wanted to be an actor, a famous actor, and I wanted my hometown of Toledo, Ohio, to be proud of me." Farr spoke to about 400 admirers and was quoted in the New York Post: "Jamie Farr Park is certainly a highlight of my life and career."

Further exemplifying Farr's love of Toledo was his frequent mention of Tony Packo's hot dogs, a Toledo staple, on M*A*S*H. He also was shown in many episodes as a Toledo Mud Hens fan.

Since 2000, Farr has frequently donated to the Republican National Committee.

Farr has been married to Joy Ann Richards since 1963 and has two children, Jonas and Yvonne. He has a grandson named Dorian.

Since the early 1990s, Farr has battled severe rheumatoid arthritis.

In 2003, Farr and his wife wrote a children's story called "Hababy's Christmas Eve", which retells the First Christmas from the point of view of the animals.

Farr is a fan of professional wrestling, as revealed by Rikishi after the two met at the 2021 Steel City Comic Con in Pittsburgh.

Select filmography

 Appeared in "The Impossible Mission" (September 1968 - Season 4, Episode 1 (at approximately the 8:10 mark in the no-commercials version)) episode of Get Smart as a musician.
 Farr appeared in two episodes, as Theodore in "Panic" (1959) and as Pooch, the ranch hand, in "Two Weeks" (1961), of the ABC Western television series, The Rebel starring Nick Adams.
 Appeared as Thaddeus in the 1965 movie The Greatest Story Ever Told about the life of Jesus Christ.
 Appeared in episode 99, "Lucy, the Rain Goddess" on The Lucy Show in 1966.
 Appeared in episode 16, "Get me to Mecca on Time" as Achmed in season one of I Dream of Jeannie.
 Appeared in Death Valley Days, season 15, episode 15 "Silver Tombstone" as Dick Gird (1967).
 Played a police officer in a 1969 episode of The Flying Nun, "Cast Your Bread Upon the Waters".
 Appeared as the 'Sheik' in The Cannonball Run, Cannonball Run II, and Speed Zone.
 Played a restaurant delivery boy in four early episodes of The Dick Van Dyke Show (#1.4, #1.5, #1.11, #1.12).
 Made two appearances in the first season of F Troop: an uncredited role as a lackey of Geronimo in the episode "Our Hero. What's His Name?" and a credited role as Standup Bull, a bumbling Native American stand-up comic, in the episode "Too Many Cooks Spoil the Troop".
 Cameos in two episodes of Gomer Pyle, U.S.M.C., one as a USMC sergeant ("Gomer Pyle POW") and the second as a special effects man ("A Star is Not Born")
 A 1970 episode of The Mod Squad, "Should Auld Acquaintance Be Forgot!", has Farr in a small uncredited role as part of a movie production crew.
 Episode "Boot" of Emergency! (2nd season) had Farr as a patient who has a curse on him and couldn't move his right arm. Dr. Early was able to remove the curse.
 Played a gypsy named Gracos in an episode of The Andy Griffith Show titled "The Gypsies".
 Guest appearance on The Love Boat.
 Appeared in Barnaby Jones, season 3, episode 20 "Doomed Alibi" as Marty Paris (first aired March 11, 1975).
 Appeared in Season 1 Episode 13 of Kolchak: The Night Stalker, 1975.
 Played himself in The Fall Guy, Season 1, Episode 7 "Japanese Connection" (first aired December 16, 1981).
 Competed in three broadcasts of Battle of the Network Stars, twice having served as his team's captain.
 Hosted the unsold game shows pilots Oddball, Double Up, and Surprise, Surprise, and guest hosted Wordplay for a week in summer 1987
 In the 1988 movie Scrooged had a cameo as himself, acting in a movie directed by Bill Murray's character.
 Appeared in Diagnosis: Murder episode "Drill for Death" (#5.15) along with several other actors from the movie and TV versions of M*A*S*H.
 Guest appearance on That '70s Show on the season 5 episode "The Girl I Love".
 Substituted in 2004 for the ailing Frank Gorshin starring as George Burns in the national tour of the one-man show Say Goodnight, Gracie.
 Played himself in Family Guy episode "Believe It or Not, Joe's Walking on Air" as a video instructor for leg surgery.
 Appeared in A Grandpa for Christmas as a choreographer opposite Ernest Borgnine.
 Appeared in the plays George Washington Slept Here, Over the Moon, Catch Me If You Can, Busybody, Don't Dress for Dinner and Lend Me a Tenor at the New Theatre Restaurant, a dinner theater in Overland Park, Kansas.
 Farr was cast in The Last Romance at Theatre Aquarius in Hamilton, Ontario in February 2013. He previously appeared at Theatre Aquarius in the title role in Tuesdays with Morrie, which he reprised at Judson Theatre Company. 
 Played the role of Snorkel opposite Red Skelton and Buster Crabbe on The Red Skelton Show.
 Appeared in My Favorite Martian, as a hospital orderly in the season 3 episode, "Virus M for Martian" and in "The Avenue C Mob" as a jewel thief.
 Appeared in Hazel, as Antonio in episode "Let's Get Away from It All" (1964) & Counterman in episode "Barney Hatfield, Where Are You?"
Guest starred in Bella and the Bulldogs, as Ernie, the mailman, in episode "Bad Grandma" (2016)

References

External links

Jamie Farr Official Site (archived 2006)

1934 births
Living people
People from Toledo, Ohio
Male actors from Toledo, Ohio
Writers from Toledo, Ohio
Military personnel from Ohio
American male film actors
American male television actors
American male stage actors
American game show hosts
American male voice actors
Ohio Republicans
United States Army soldiers
American people of Lebanese descent
Male actors from Los Angeles